Mère et Fille is a French comedy television series which premiered on 3 June 2012 on Disney Channel France.

Plot 
The series tells the life of 14-year-old Barbara and her mother, Isabelle, who is a divorced lawyer.

Cast and characters 
 Isabelle Desplantes as Isabelle Marteau
 Lubna Gourion as Barbara Marteau
 Thérèse Roussel as Barbara's grandmother 
 Thomas Goldberg as Raphaël 
 Arthur Jacquin as Gaël 
 Clara Leroux as Léa, Barbara's friend
 Romain Arnolin as Hugo, Barbara' friend
 Lillia Alami as Pauline, Hugo's little sister
 Alain Bouzigues as Mr Balain
 Philippe Cura as Gaël's Father
 Grégory Le Moigne as Laurent, Barbara's Father
 Claudia Tagbo as Claudia, Hugo's mother 
 Philémon as the virtual coach

Episodes

Season 1 (2012)

Season 2 (2013)

Season 3 (2014) 

The third season premiered on Disney Channel France on 13 May 2014. The episodes are compounds of four mini-episodes.

Movie (2016) 
Mère et Fille, California Dream tells the story of Barbara, who has won a fashion contest, but the problem is the contest takes place in California and she lives in Paris. It has been referred to and marketed as the first French Disney Channel Original Movie.

Season 4 (2017) 

On 18 March 2017, a special episode surrounding around Barbara turning 20 years old aired as part of Disney Channel France's 20th anniversary programming. It has been announced that the fourth season will start airing on 8 April 2017. In this season, Barbara will be 16 years old, and Isabelle 42 years old.

References

External links 
 

2010s French comedy television series
2012 French television series debuts
Disney Channels Worldwide original programming
French-language Disney Channel original programming
Television series about teenagers